Adaina praeusta is a moth of the family Pterophoridae. It was described from Puerto Rico.

Taxonomy
The type specimen of this species is lost and the original description is so cryptic that it is not possible to identify a species based on this description. It might be a synonym of another described species or might belong in another genus.

References

Moths described in 1890
Oidaematophorini